Seitz Lake is a glacial tarn in the Ruby Mountains, in Elko County in the northeastern part of the state of Nevada.

Seitz Lake is a major source of flow to Rabbit Creek (formerly known as Seitz Creek), which after exiting the mountains passes near the community of Spring Creek, meanders down Lamoille Valley, and then merges with the main branch of the Humboldt River between Halleck and Elburz, NV.

The lake was named after brothers George and Edward Seitz, who were early ranchers in Pleasant Valley. George eventually left the area, but Ed Seitz became the sheriff of Elko County in 1869.

References 

Lakes of Elko County, Nevada
Ruby Mountains
Lakes of Nevada
Lakes of the Great Basin